Christian Joel Sánchez Leal (born 9 July 1999), known as Christian Joel, is a Cuban footballer who plays as a goalkeeper for Spanish club Celta de Vigo B, on loan from Sporting de Gijón.

Club career
Born in Havana, Christian Joel moved to Spain at early age and joined Sporting de Gijón's youth setup at the age of 12. On 20 August 2017, he made his senior debut with the reserves by starting in a 1–0 Segunda División B home defeat of SD Gernika Club.

Christian Joel renewed his contract until 2021 on 25 January 2018, but spent the campaign as a backup to Dani Martín. He made his first team debut on 8 June of the following year, starting in a 1–0 home win against Cádiz CF in the Segunda División championship.

On 27 August 2021, Christian Joel extended his contract until 2026, and was loaned to Cypriot First Division side AEK Larnaca FC for one year. On 19 August of the following year, he moved to Celta de Vigo B also in a temporary one-year deal.

References

External links
 
 
 

1999 births
Living people
Sportspeople from Havana
Cuban footballers
French footballers
Association football goalkeepers
Segunda División players
Segunda División B players
Sporting de Gijón B players
Sporting de Gijón players
Celta de Vigo B players
Cypriot First Division players
AEK Larnaca FC players
Cuban expatriate footballers
Cuban expatriate sportspeople in Spain
Expatriate footballers in Spain
Expatriate footballers in Cyprus